This is a list of fictional dogs in originating in video games, and it is subsidiary to the list of fictional dogs. It is a collection of various notable dogs that are featured in video games, including arcade games, personal computer games, or console games.

References

 
 
Dogs